Hwayang-dong is a dong located in west Gwangjin-gu in Seoul, South Korea. It was incorporated into Gwangjin-gu on 13 August 1949. It is a mixed residential and small business area. Mojin-dong is also administered by Hwayang-dong and contains Konkuk University.

See also 
Administrative divisions of South Korea

References

External links
 Gwangjin-gu official website in English
 Map of Gwangjin-gu at the Gwangjin-gu official website
 Hwayang-dong resident office website

Neighbourhoods of Gwangjin District